The 1939 Idaho Southern Branch Bengals football team was an American football team that represented the University of Idaho, Southern Branch (later renamed Idaho State University) as an independent during the 1939 college football season. In their fifth season under head coach Guy Wicks, the team compiled a 5–2 record and outscored opponents by a total of 67 to 48.

Schedule

Notes

References

External links
 1940 Wickiup football section — yearbook summary of the 1939 season

Idaho Southern Branch
Idaho State Bengals football seasons
Idaho Southern Branch Bengals football